Thomas Martin Brown (born November 20, 1964) is a former professional American football player for the National Football League's Miami Dolphins. He played in 10 games total between the 1987 and 1989 seasons after his collegiate career at Pittsburgh.

References

1964 births
Living people
American football running backs
Miami Dolphins players
People from Ridgway, Pennsylvania
Pittsburgh Panthers football players
Players of American football from Pennsylvania